William Besse (born 10 March 1968 in Bruson) is a Swiss former alpine skier. He took four wins and 13 podiums in the FIS Alpine Ski World Cup, all of them in the downhill discipline, including winning the Lauberhorn downhill in Wengen in 1994. He retired from competition in 1999, in part because he struggled to adapt to the introduction of carving skis in the mid-1990s. After retiring from competition, he became a ski instructor in Verbier, and also worked as an analyst for Télévision Suisse Romande and Radio Télévision Suisse's coverage of alpine skiing, until he was let go after the 2014-15 season.

He is related to alpine skier Justin Murisier through Murisier's father, who is Besse's cousin.

Competitions
 Olympic Games
 Alpine skiing at the 1992 Winter Olympics – Men's combined
 Alpine skiing at the 1994 Winter Olympics – Men's downhill
 Alpine skiing at the 1994 Winter Olympics – Men's super-G

 Alpine Skiing World Cup
 1988 Alpine Skiing World Cup – Men's Combined
 1988 Alpine Skiing World Cup – Men's Downhill
 1989 Alpine Skiing World Cup – Men's Combined
 1989 Alpine Skiing World Cup – Men's Downhill
 1989 Alpine Skiing World Cup – Men's Overall
 1990 Alpine Skiing World Cup – Men's Combined
 1990 Alpine Skiing World Cup – Men's Downhill
 1990 Alpine Skiing World Cup – Men's Overall
 1991 Alpine Skiing World Cup – Men's Combined
 1991 Alpine Skiing World Cup – Men's Downhill
 1991 Alpine Skiing World Cup – Men's Overall
 1992 Alpine Skiing World Cup – Men's Combined
 1992 Alpine Skiing World Cup – Men's Downhill
 1992 Alpine Skiing World Cup – Men's Super G
 1993 Alpine Skiing World Cup – Men's Combined
 1993 Alpine Skiing World Cup – Men's Downhill
 1993 Alpine Skiing World Cup – Men's Super G
 1994 Alpine Skiing World Cup – Men's Downhill
 1994 Alpine Skiing World Cup – Men's Super G
 1995 Alpine Skiing World Cup – Men's Downhill
 1995 Alpine Skiing World Cup – Men's Super G
 1996 Alpine Skiing World Cup – Men's Downhill
 1996 Alpine Skiing World Cup – Men's Super G

See also
 Switzerland at the 1992 Winter Olympics
 Switzerland at the 1994 Winter Olympics

References

External links 
  
 
 

1968 births
Living people
Swiss male alpine skiers
Alpine skiers at the 1992 Winter Olympics
Alpine skiers at the 1994 Winter Olympics
Olympic alpine skiers of Switzerland
People from Entremont district
Sportspeople from Valais
20th-century Swiss people